Obo is a Manobo language spoken around Mount Apo on the island of Mindanao in the Philippines.

References

Manobo languages
Languages of Cotabato
Languages of Davao del Sur